In mathematics, the E lattice is a special lattice in R. It can be characterized as the unique positive-definite, even, unimodular lattice of rank 8. The name derives from the fact that it is the root lattice of the E root system.

The norm of the E lattice (divided by 2) is a positive definite even unimodular quadratic form in 8 variables, and conversely such a quadratic form can be used to construct a positive-definite, even, unimodular lattice of rank 8.
The existence of such a form was first shown by H. J. S. Smith in 1867, and the first explicit construction of this quadratic form was given by Korkin and Zolotarev in 1873.

The E lattice is also called the Gosset lattice after Thorold Gosset who was one of the first to study the geometry of the lattice itself around 1900.

Lattice points
The E lattice is a discrete subgroup of R of full rank (i.e. it spans all of R). It can be given explicitly by the set of points Γ ⊂ R such that
all the coordinates are integers or all the coordinates are half-integers (a mixture of integers and half-integers is not allowed), and
the sum of the eight coordinates is an even integer.
In symbols,

It is not hard to check that the sum of two lattice points is another lattice point, so that Γ is indeed a subgroup.

An alternative description of the E lattice which is sometimes convenient is the set of all points in Γ′ ⊂ R such that
all the coordinates are integers and the sum of the coordinates is even, or
all the coordinates are half-integers and the sum of the coordinates is odd.
In symbols,

The lattices Γ and Γ′ are isomorphic and one may pass from one to the other by changing the signs of any odd number of half-integer coordinates. The lattice Γ is sometimes called the even coordinate system for E while the lattice Γ′ is called the odd coordinate system. Unless we specify otherwise we shall work in the even coordinate system.

Properties
The E lattice Γ can be characterized as the unique lattice in R with the following properties:
It is integral, meaning that all scalar products of lattice elements are integers.
It is unimodular, meaning that it is integral, and can be generated by the columns of an 8×8 matrix with determinant ±1 (i.e. the volume of the fundamental parallelotope of the lattice is 1). Equivalently, Γ is self-dual, meaning it is equal to its dual lattice.
It is even, meaning that the norm of any lattice vector is even.
Even unimodular lattices can occur only in dimensions divisible by 8. In dimension 16 there are two such lattices: Γ ⊕ Γ and Γ (constructed in an analogous fashion to Γ. In dimension 24 there are 24 such lattices, called Niemeier lattices. The most important of these is the Leech lattice.

One possible basis for Γ is given by the columns of the (upper triangular) matrix

Γ is then the integral span of these vectors. All other possible bases are obtained from this one by right multiplication by elements of GL(8,Z).

The shortest nonzero vectors in Γ have length equal to √2. There are 240 such vectors:

All half-integer (can only be ±1/2):
All positive or all negative: 2
Four positive, four negative: (8*7*6*5)/(4*3*2*1)=70
Two of one, six of the other: 2*(8*7)/(2*1) = 56
All integer (can only be 0, ±1):
Two ±1, six zeroes: 4*(8*7)/(2*1)=112

These form a root system of type E. The lattice Γ is equal to the E root lattice, meaning that it is given by the integral span of the 240 roots. Any choice of 8 simple roots gives a basis for Γ.

Symmetry group
The automorphism group (or symmetry group) of a lattice in R is defined as the subgroup of the orthogonal group O(n) that preserves the lattice. The symmetry group of the E lattice is the Weyl/Coxeter group of type E. This is the group generated by reflections in the hyperplanes orthogonal to the 240 roots of the lattice. Its order is given by

The E Weyl group contains a subgroup of order 128·8! consisting of all permutations of the coordinates and all even sign changes. This subgroup is the Weyl group of type D. The full E Weyl group is generated by this subgroup and the block diagonal matrix H⊕H where H is the Hadamard matrix

Geometry
 See 5 honeycomb

The E lattice points are the vertices of the 5 honeycomb, which is composed of regular 8-simplex and 8-orthoplex facets. This honeycomb was first studied by Gosset who called it a 9-ic semi-regular figure (Gosset regarded honeycombs in n dimensions as degenerate n+1 polytopes). In Coxeter's notation, Gosset's honeycomb is denoted by 5 and has the Coxeter-Dynkin diagram:

This honeycomb is highly regular in the sense that its symmetry group (the affine  Weyl group) acts transitively on the k-faces for k ≤ 6. All of the k-faces for k ≤ 7 are simplices.

The vertex figure of Gosset's honeycomb is the semiregular E polytope (4 in Coxeter's notation) given by the convex hull of the 240 roots of the E lattice.

Each point of the E lattice is surrounded by 2160 8-orthoplexes and 17280 8-simplices. The 2160 deep holes near the origin are exactly the halves of the norm 4 lattice points. The 17520 norm 8 lattice points fall into two classes (two orbits under the action of the E automorphism group): 240 are twice the norm 2 lattice points while 17280 are 3 times the shallow holes surrounding the origin.

A hole in a lattice is a point in the ambient Euclidean space whose distance to the nearest lattice point is a local maximum. (In a lattice defined as a uniform honeycomb these points correspond to the centers of the facets volumes.) A deep hole is one whose distance to the lattice is a global maximum. There are two types of holes in the E lattice:
Deep holes such as the point (1,0,0,0,0,0,0,0) are at a distance of 1 from the nearest lattice points. There are 16 lattice points at this distance which form the vertices of an 8-orthoplex centered at the hole (the Delaunay cell of the hole).
There are 9 lattice points at this distance forming the vertices of an 8-simplex centered at the hole.

Sphere packings and kissing numbers
The E lattice is remarkable in that it gives optimal solutions to the sphere packing problem and the kissing number problem in 8 dimensions.

The sphere packing problem asks what is the densest way to pack (solid) n-dimensional spheres of a fixed radius in R so that no two spheres overlap. Lattice packings are special types of sphere packings where the spheres are centered at the points of a lattice. Placing spheres of radius 1/ at the points of the E lattice gives a lattice packing in R with a density of

A 1935 paper of Hans Frederick Blichfeldt proved that this is the maximum density that can be achieved by a lattice packing in 8 dimensions. Furthermore, the E lattice is the unique lattice (up to isometries and rescalings) with this density. Maryna Viazovska proved in 2016 that this density is, in fact, optimal even among irregular packings.

The kissing number problem asks what is the maximum number of spheres of a fixed radius that can touch (or "kiss") a central sphere of the same radius. In the E lattice packing mentioned above any given sphere touches 240 neighboring spheres. This is because there are 240 lattice vectors of minimum nonzero norm (the roots of the E lattice). It was shown in 1979 that this is the maximum possible number in 8 dimensions.

The sphere packing problem and the kissing number problem are remarkably difficult and optimal solutions are only known in 1, 2, 3, 8, and 24 dimensions (plus dimension 4 for the kissing number problem). The fact that solutions are known in dimensions 8 and 24 follows in part from the special properties of the E lattice and its 24-dimensional cousin, the Leech lattice.

Theta function
One can associate to any (positive-definite) lattice Λ a theta function given by

The theta function of a lattice is then a holomorphic function on the upper half-plane. Furthermore, the theta function of an even unimodular lattice of rank n is actually a modular form of weight n/2. The theta function of an integral lattice is often written as a power series in  so that the coefficient of q gives the number of lattice vectors of norm n.

Up to normalization, there is a unique modular form of weight 4 and level 1: the Eisenstein series G(τ). The theta function for the E lattice must then be proportional to G(τ). The normalization can be fixed by noting that there is a unique vector of norm 0. This gives

where σ(n) is the divisor function. It follows that the number of E lattice vectors of norm 2n is 240 times the sum of the cubes of the divisors of n. The first few terms of this series are given by :

The E theta function may be written in terms of the Jacobi theta functions  as follows:

where

Other constructions

Hamming code
The E lattice is very closely related to the (extended) Hamming code H(8,4) and can, in fact, be constructed from it. The Hamming code H(8,4) is a binary code of length 8 and rank 4; that is, it is a 4-dimensional subspace of the finite vector space (F). Writing elements of (F) as 8-bit integers in hexadecimal, the code H(8,4) can by given explicitly as the set
{00, 0F, 33, 3C, 55, 5A, 66, 69, 96, 99, A5, AA, C3, CC, F0, FF}.
The code H(8,4) is significant partly because it is a Type II self-dual code. It has a minimum Hamming weight 4, meaning that any two codewords differ by at least 4 bits. It is the largest length 8 binary code with this property.

One can construct a lattice Λ from a binary code C of length n by taking the set of all vectors x in Z such that x is congruent (modulo 2) to a codeword of C. It is often convenient to rescale Λ by a factor of 1/,

Applying this construction a Type II self-dual code gives an even, unimodular lattice. In particular, applying it to the Hamming code H(8,4) gives an E lattice. It is not entirely trivial, however, to find an explicit isomorphism between this lattice and the lattice Γ defined above.

Integral octonions
The E lattice is also closely related to the nonassociative algebra of real octonions O. It is possible to define the concept of an integral octonion analogous to that of an integral quaternion. The integral octonions naturally form a lattice inside O. This lattice is just a rescaled E lattice. (The minimum norm in the integral octonion lattice is 1 rather than 2). Embedded in the octonions in this manner the E lattice takes on the structure of a nonassociative ring.

Fixing a basis (1, i, j, k, ℓ, ℓi, ℓj, ℓk)  of unit octonions,
one can define the integral octonions as a maximal order containing this basis. (One must, of course, extend the definitions of order and ring to include the nonassociative case). This amounts to finding the largest subring of O containing the units on which the expressions x*x (the norm of x) and x + x* (twice the real part of x) are integer-valued. There are actually seven such maximal orders, one corresponding to each of the seven imaginary units. However, all seven maximal orders are isomorphic.

A detailed account of the integral octonions and their relation to the E lattice can be found in Conway and Smith (2003).

Example definition of integral octonions
Consider octonion multiplication defined by triads: 137, 267, 457, 125, 243, 416, 356. Then integral octonions form vectors:

1) ,  i=0, 1, …, 7

2) ,  indexes abc run through the seven triads 124, 235, 346, 457, 561, 672, 713

3) ,  indexes pqrs run through the seven tetrads 3567, 1467, 1257, 1236, 2347, 1345, 2456.

Imaginary octonions in this set, namely 14 from 1) and 7*16=112 from 3), form the roots of the Lie algebra . Along with the remaining 2+112 vectors we obtain 240 vectors that form roots of Lie algebra .

Applications
In 1982 Michael Freedman produced an example of a topological 4-manifold, called the E manifold, whose intersection form is given by the E lattice. This manifold is an example of a topological manifold which admits no smooth structure and is not even triangulable.

In string theory, the heterotic string is a peculiar hybrid of a 26-dimensional bosonic string and a 10-dimensional superstring. In order for the theory to work correctly, the 16 mismatched dimensions must be compactified on an even, unimodular lattice of rank 16. There are two such lattices: Γ>⊕Γ and Γ (constructed in a fashion analogous to that of Γ). These lead to two version of the heterotic string known as the E×E heterotic string and the SO(32) heterotic string.

See also
Leech lattice
E (mathematics)
Semiregular E-polytope

References

 Chapter 9 contains a discussion of the integral octonions and the E lattice.

Lattice points
Quadratic forms
Lattice